Blood on the Bricks is a studio album by the Iron City Houserockers released in 1981.  A more restrained album than their previous two efforts, the album was produced by Steve Cropper (of Booker T. and the M.G.'s) instead of hard rock producers as on Have a Good Time but Get out Alive!.  Among the more popular songs on the album were the title track, along with "Saints and Sinners" (a song about a Vietnam veteran), and "Be My Friend" which includes a guitar riff in tribute to Van Morrison's "Here Comes the Night"; all of which still feature in Joe Grushecky's modern live performances.  Like the band's previous two albums, Blood on the Bricks would be praised by critics but largely ignored by the public.  Before their next album the band would change their name to simply "The Houserockers" in an attempt to achieve success outside of their native region.

The album has never been reissued on CD but was re-released in remastered form as a digital download from Grushecky's official website in 2015.

Track listing 

Friday Night (Joe Grushecky) - 3:51
Saints and Sinners (Grushecky) - 4:24
This Time the Night (Won't Save Us) (Eddie Britt, Grushecky, Art Nardini) - 3:56
Be My Friend (Grushecky) - 4:20
No Easy Way Out (Grushecky) - 3:21
No More Loneliness (Grushecky) - 3:54
Watch Out (Britt, Grushecky, Gil Snyder) - 4:18
Blood on the Bricks (Grushecky) - 4:19
A Fool's Advice (Grushecky) - 5:11

Personnel 
Joe Grushecky - lead vocal, guitar
Eddie Britt - guitar, vocals
Art Nardini - bass
Gil Snyder - keyboards, vocals
Ned E. Rankin - drums
Marc Reisman - harmonica, vocals

Guest musicians 
Steve Cropper - guitar (solo "This Time The Night")
Jim Horn - saxophone
Steve Forman - percussion
Steve Madeo - trumpet
Brick Alley Boys Town Choir - background vocals

References 

1981 albums
Iron City Houserockers albums
Albums produced by Steve Cropper
MCA Records albums